CandyRat Records (also stylized as CANdYRAT) is an independent American record label and online music store located in Menomonee Falls, Wisconsin. They primarily represent instrumental guitar artists, with a focus on acoustic guitar, but include electronic music, alternative rock, singer-songwriter, and progressive rock, with musicians coming from many countries.

Rob Poland founded the label in 2004, first signing fingerstyle guitar talent Don Ross, followed by Andy McKee, Antoine Dufour, and three other artists before officially opening in 2005. CandyRat Records has been called the "biggest acoustical guitar label in the world", and the two-handed tapping technique of playing the guitar to produce bass, rhythm, melody and harmony, which is practised by many of its artists, has become known as the CandyRat style. The label gained fame after videos on its official YouTube page, 'rpoland', gained viral success. Recording sessions are filmed and uploaded, contributing to the success of the albums. As of November 2014, the most popular video on the channel, a live recording of Andy Mckee's "Drifting", garnered over 50 million views. Their YouTube channel has over a half-million subscribers and almost four-hundred million views.

CandyRat Guitar Night Tour features CandyRat Records' guitar virtuosos traveling the U.S. and the world. For 2017, Antoine Dufour and Ian Ethan Case toured. CandyRat is also a festival partner for the Wilson Center Guitar Competition & Festival, with Rob Poland and the CandyRat headliners as some of the judges for the fingerstyle competition.

Artists
CandyRat Records had a community of over 50 signed and independent artists as of August 2017.

Current

Adam Ben Ezra
Alex Anderson
Alex Trugman
Andrew White
Antoine Dufour
Ben Flanders
Brendan Power
Brooke Miller
Calum Graham
Chris Mike
Chris Woods Groove
Craig D'Andrea
Daniel Voth
Dean Magraw
Derrin Nauendorf
Don Ross
Emma Dean
Erick Turnbull
Erik Mongrain
Eva Atmatzidou
Ewan Dobson
Gareth Pearson
Gregory Hoskins
Guitar Republic
Hunter van Larkins
Ian Ethan Case
Jimmy Wahlsteen
Justin Taylor
Kelly Sciandra
Kelly Valleau
Laszlo
Luca Stricagnoli
Lucas Michailidis
Mark Minelli
Mathieu Fiset
Matthew Santos
Michael Chapdelaine
Michael Kobrin
Michael Manring
Mike Dawes
Nicholas Barron
Peter Ciluzzi
Pino Forastiere
Preston Reed
Ray Montford Group
Richard Barrett
Ryan Ayers
Ryan Spendlove
Sammy Boller
Sebastien Cloutier
Sergio Altamura
Spencer Elliott
Stefano Barone
Steffen Schackinger
Steven Padin
The Reign of Kindo
Thomas Leeb
Tommy Gauthier
Trevor Gordon Hall
Van Larkins

Former
Maneli Jamal
Andy McKee
Robert Taylor

References

External links
Official Website
The Music Life Podcast – Rob made a Candy Rat

American record labels